Dmytro Yuriyovych Nazarenko (born on 30 December 1985) is a Ukrainian statesman, who is currently the acting head of the Kyiv Oblast State Administration since 25 January 2023.

Biography

Dmytro Nazarenko was born in Sumy on 30 December 1985.

From 2003 to 2009, Nazarenko studied at Sumy State University, majoring in hydraulic and pneumatic machines.

From 2005 to 2012, he was the director of Mashhimnaftoservice LLC. From 2012 to 2015, he was the director of Tehmas LLC.

On 6 March 2015, Nazarenko was appointed the head of the Trostyanetska raion state administration of the Sumy Oblast, while simultaneously becoming a deputy of the Trostyanetska district council.

He graduated from the Kharkiv National University of Internal Affairs in 2016, majoring in law. At the beginning of 2018, Nazarenko became the head of the Department of Regional Development of the Kyiv Regional State Administration.

On 12 January 2018, he was appointed deputy head of the Kyiv Regional State Administration. On 10 December 2020, Nazarenko became the first deputy head of the Kyiv Regional State Administration.

On 25 January 2023, after Oleksiy Kuleba, was appointed as the deputy head of the Office of the President of Ukraine, Nazarenko became the acting head of the Kyiv regional military administration.

References

1985 births
Living people
Politicians from Sumy
People of the 2022 Russian invasion of Ukraine
Governors of Kyiv Oblast